Cartoon/S&M is a double album of contemporary classical music by American composer John Zorn. The piece Kol Nidre which appears in two versions on this recording is a tune from Zorn's Masada songbook.

Reception

The Allmusic review by Thom Jurek awarded the album 4½ stars stating "This collection proves Zorn's astonishingly varied and sustaining contribution to late-century classical music. It should not only be owned, but studied, reflected upon for inspiration. Amazing".

Track listing 
All compositions by John Zorn.
 Disc One: 
 "Cat O’Nine Tails" - 15:35 
 "Carny" - 12:35
 "For Your Eyes Only" - 15:02 
 "Kol Nidre" (string quartet) - 7:55 
 Disc Two: 
 "The Dead Man" - 12:44
 "Music for Children" - 14:29
 "Memento Mori" - 26:28
 "Kol Nidre" (clarinet quartet) - 6:47

Recorded at Concertzaal, Tilburg on April 8, 1998 (Disc One track 3), and at Grasland Studios, Haarlem on November 8–13, 1999 (Disc One tracks 1 & 4, Disc Two tracks 1 & 3), February 21, 2000 (Disc One track 2), and February 22, 2000 (Disc Two tracks 2 & 4).

Personnel 
 Mondriaan Quartet
 Annette Bergman – viola
 Carl Fischer – score
 Ermo Hartsuiker – clarinet (Bass)
 Arnold Marinissen – percussion
 Tomoko Mukaiyama – piano
 Kazunori Sugiyama – associate producer
 Guido Tichelman – engineer
 Allan Tucker – mastering
 Jan-Erik Van Regteren Altena – violin, cello
 John Zorn – executive producer

References 

2000 albums
Albums produced by John Zorn
John Zorn albums
Tzadik Records albums